Personally may refer to:

 "Personally" (P-Square song), 2013
 "Personally" (Karla Bonoff song), 1982